Johann Joseph Jansen (1825–1849) was a German revolutionary. He was the brother of Karl Jansen,  Johann Joseph was a democrat and as a result he became leader of the Cologne Workers' Association.  He was a supporter of Gottschalk.  He was shot by Prussian authorities in 1849 for his participation in the Baden-Palatinate uprising of 1849.

References

1825 births
1849 deaths
German socialists
German revolutionaries